Bad Moon Rising is the second studio album by American rock band Sonic Youth, released on March 29, 1985, by Blast First and Homestead Records. The album is loosely themed around the dark side of America, including references to obsession, insanity, Charles Manson, heavy metal, Satanism, and early European settlers' encounters with Native Americans.

Released to strong reviews from the underground music press, Bad Moon Rising was the band's first album to combine experimental material with transitional pieces and segues. The album was preceded by the single "Death Valley '69", which did not chart in either the US or UK (the track was re-recorded for the album and released again as a single in June 1985). The album was named after the 1969 song "Bad Moon Rising" by Creedence Clearwater Revival.

History 
Sonic Youth was formed in New York City in 1981 by guitarists Thurston Moore and Lee Ranaldo and bass guitarist Kim Gordon. The band signed to Glenn Branca's Neutral Records, releasing the Sonic Youth EP in March 1982. As Sonic Youth released a number of albums and EPs to increasing critical acclaim, including Confusion Is Sex and Kill Yr. Idols in 1983, several drummers joined and left the band. Bob Bert rejoined Sonic Youth after the Confusion Is Sex tour in mid-1983. The New York press largely ignored Sonic Youth (as well as the noise rock scene in the city), until after a disastrous London debut in October 1983 that actually received rave reviews in British papers Sounds and NME. When they returned to New York, the queue at CBGB for the band's concerts went around the block.

By mid-1984, Sonic Youth were playing almost weekly in the city, but its members started to realize that there was little future in their musical approach; Moore later said, "it was getting to the point of overkill". They retreated to the rehearsal room, retuned their guitars and changed their equipment so that they were unable to play their old songs, and began writing new material.

Background 
After a period of intense songwriting, the band entered producer Martin Bisi's BC Studio – implicitly, "Before Christ Studio", which is how the band credited it on the album – in Brooklyn, New York in September 1984. Bisi had recorded early rappers and local avant-garde musicians such as John Zorn, Elliott Sharp and Bill Laswell.

The album's cover is a photograph by artist James Welling of a scarecrow with a flaming jack-o'-lantern as its head.

Music 
Bad Moon Risings style has been described as noise rock, no wave
and experimental rock. The album begins with "Intro", a short instrumental featuring several guitars, described by Michael Azerrad as "a melancholic, meowing slide line playing off a delicate stack of crystalline arpeggios." "Intro" segues into the next song, "Brave Men Run (In My Family)". The song begins with a single riff repeating for a minute, before Gordon murmurs, "Brave man run in my family/Brave men run away from me." The riff fades into the album's third song, "Society Is a Hole", "a one-chord hymn to big-city anomie". Sonic Youth's use of transitional pieces in the album was inspired by their live shows, which featured either Moore or Ranaldo tuning guitars for up to five minutes while the other played slow transitory guitar riffs or prerecorded sound collages.

"I Love Her All the Time" features extensive prepared guitar by Ranaldo and the use of one chord, with a noise section in the middle; like many of the album's songs, it focuses on texture and rhythm rather than melody. The second side of Bad Moon Rising, which comprises the experimental "Ghost Bitch" (which features Ranaldo on acoustic guitar and references Native Americans' first encounter with European settlers), "I'm Insane" and "Justice is Might", expands on the soundscape concept; the songs feature repeating guitar riffs that segue from one song to the next, while Moore and Gordon mumble cryptic lyrics.

"Death Valley '69", the album's closer, was the result of a collaboration between Moore and New York singer and poet Lydia Lunch. Describing the album's style, Pitchfork called it "not so much a collection of songs as it is an extended, unending uproar, seamless in sound and theme."

Critical reception 

AllMusic noted the album's dark nature, writing: "An album quite unlike any other in the colorful Sonic Youth canon, Bad Moon Rising captures the New York band in 1985 during its most morose phase, one that is quite forbidding yet fascinating all the same." Trouser Press wrote that it "[exudes] all the horrible beauty of a mushroom cloud on the horizon." Pitchfork described the album's aesthetic as "compelling."

Accolades 
Bad Moon Rising ranked at No. 42 in Alternative Press's list of the greatest albums of 1985–1995, surpassing Daydream Nation.

Track listing 
All music and lyrics written by Sonic Youth (Kim Gordon, Thurston Moore, Lee Ranaldo, and Bob Bert), except where noted.

 Tracks 10 and 11 are reversed on some CD pressings
 Track 12 is not included on the 1989 first CD pressing by Blast First

Personnel 
Sonic Youth

 Thurston Moore – guitars, prepared guitar, lead vocals, production
 Kim Gordon – bass guitar, lead vocals, backing vocals ("Death Valley '69"), production
 Lee Ranaldo – guitars, percussion ("Ghost Bitch"), backing vocals ("Death Valley '69"), production
 Bob Bert – drums, production

Additional personnel
 Lydia Lunch – lead vocals and production on "Death Valley '69"

Production
 Martin Bisi – engineer, producer (all tracks except 10–11)
 Ethan James – engineer (tracks 10–11)
 John Erskine – producer (all tracks except 10–11)

Release history

References

External links 

 

1985 albums
Sonic Youth albums
Homestead Records albums
Albums produced by Martin Bisi
DGC Records albums
Blast First albums
Rough Trade Records albums
No wave albums
Noise rock albums by American artists